is a Japanese biathlete. She was born in the Niigata Prefecture. She competed at the Biathlon World Championships 2012 and 2013, and at the 2014 Winter Olympics in Sochi, in the individual and sprint competitions.

References

External links

1990 births
Living people
Sportspeople from Niigata Prefecture
Biathletes at the 2014 Winter Olympics
Japanese female biathletes
Olympic biathletes of Japan
21st-century Japanese women